Richard Rober (born Richard Steven Rauber; May 14, 1906 – May 26, 1952) was an American stage and film actor. From the mid-1930s to the mid-1940s he featured in numerous theatre productions, including being part of the original cast of Born Yesterday in Chicago, and the long-running Oklahoma!. In 1947 he moved to Hollywood and appeared in dozens of B-movies and film noir-type films, including Call Northside 777 (1948), Sierra (1950), and The Well (1951). He died in an automobile accident in 1952 at the age of 46.

Early life and family
Richard Steven Rauber was born in Rochester, New York, on May 14, 1906. He was the son of Frederick S. Rauber, an attorney, and Elizabeth Ford.

Career
Rober began his career as a stage actor in the mid-1930s under his real name, Richard Rauber. Penniless and looking for work after his graduation from the University of Rochester, he landed a small part in a play by the Lyceum Players starring Louis Calhern. He went on to act with nearly every repertory theatre company on the East Coast. He was part of the original Chicago company of Born Yesterday. He also performed in the long-running Oklahoma!.

In 1947, Rober embarked on a career in Hollywood, appearing in his first film role in Call Northside 777 (1948). He appeared in many B-movies—including Sierra (1950)—and film noir drama films such as The File on Thelma Jordon (1950) and The Well (1951). In July 1951 it was reported that he had appeared in 26 films in his 3 1/2 years in Hollywood.

While Rober mostly played supporting roles, his career began to go on the ascendancy before his death in 1952. He had a starring role in The Well (1951), and had traveled to Austria to play the lead in the MGM production The Devil Makes Three (1952). The week before his death, he played the lead in Corny Johnson, a television film produced by Bing Crosby Enterprises.

Personal life
Rober was married twice. His second marriage, at age 40, was to Mary Hay Barthelmess, age 23, daughter of actors Richard Barthelmess and Mary Hay, in New York in January 1946. They later divorced.

Death
Rober died after crashing his car in the San Fernando Valley on May 26, 1952. He had been driving with a passenger, actress Norma Britton. The car swerved off the highway in heavy fog and plummeted over a  embankment, something which, three years earlier, in The File on Thelma Jordon, he actually depicted, sitting next to Barbara Stanwyck. Rescuers took the pair to Santa Monica Hospital, where Rober died a few hours later. Britton survived with rib injuries.

Rober was eulogized in Rochester and buried in the Holy Sepulchre Cemetery there.

Filmography

Stage credits

Sources:

References

Sources

External links

1906 births
1952 deaths
20th-century American male actors
American male film actors
Male Western (genre) film actors
Male actors from Rochester, New York
Road incident deaths in California
University of Rochester alumni